Ədalət Şükürov (full name Ədalət Zakir oğlu Şükürov), also known as simply Ədalət (born 22 April 1966), is an Azerbaijani pop singer and celebrity in Azerbaijan.

Biography
Ədalət Şükürov was born on 22 April 1966 in the city of Sumgait north of Baku, Azerbaijan.
After he finished school, he was drafted into Soviet Army and served three years in submarine near the Novaya Zemlya islands in Arkhangelsk Oblast of Russia. In 1987, he began studying in Saint Petersburg University of Economy, Culture and Business Administration in the faculty of "Many Events Director". When he finished the university, he began working in television network Petersburg – Channel 5 of the city in the capacity of director of "Adamovo Yabloko" show. Some time later, he moved to the city of Luga, Leningrad Oblast and began holding many events. In this city, Adalet started writing poems and composing music. After that, he began singing and performing on stage.
The first song he sang was "Nişan üzüyü" which means "Engagament ring" in Azerbaijani language. This is the song he sang in his first time appearance on AzTV in Baku.
 
Adalet likes to travel and has been on stage in about 50 countries of the world. He also finished "Salsa Viva" dance school and is also involved in artisting design. He speaks English, Spanish, Russian and Azeri fluently. He got married in 1993. He has two kids: daughter Zhale and son Emil.

Official albums

"Itirdim" album
 
1. 
2. 
3. 
4. 
5. 
6. 
7.  (duet Aygün Bəylər)
8. 
9. 
10.  (Remake)
11. 
12.

"Qoca çinar" album
 
1-
2- (Ədalət and Manana)
3-
4- (Ədalət, Vüqar, Kamran)
5- (Ədalət, Maestro Ceyhun, "Odlar yurdu" orchestra)
6- (Meyxana feat. Vüqar)
7-
8- remix
9- (Lezginka)

"Qapı" album
 
1-
2-
3-
4-
5-
6-
7-

"Demə-demə" album
 
1-
2-
3-
4-
5-
6-

"22 aprel" album

album
 
1-
2-
3-
4-
5-

References

External links 
 

1966 births
Living people
20th-century Azerbaijani male singers
People from Sumgait
Culture in Sumgait
21st-century Azerbaijani male singers